Nike+ Kinect Training is a fitness video game for the Xbox 360. It is developed in cooperation with athletics company Nike. It was released on 30 October 2012.

The game allows the user to earn and compete with others with NikeFuel points, a unit of measuring athletic performance.

The game received mixed reviews from critics, garnering a Metacritic score of 71/100 based on 12 reviews.

In February 2013, Nike+ Kinect Training'''s development team was nominated for a BAFTA Games award in the Sports/Fitness category. However, it lost to New Star Soccer'' at the 9th British Academy Games Awards.

References

2012 video games
Fitness games
Kinect games
Microsoft games
Video games developed in the United Kingdom
Xbox 360-only games
Xbox 360 games
Single-player video games
Sumo Digital games